Nahuel Aaron Lombardi (born 20 December 1995) is an Argentine footballer who plays as a left-back for Chattanooga Red Wolves SC in USL League One.

Career

Youth
Lombardi was born in Rosario, Santa Fe in Argentina and migrated to the United States when he was six years old, and grew up in Southern California, attending Laguna Hills High School. Lombardi also played with the LA Galaxy academy between 2012 and 2014.

College & Amateur
In 2014, Lombardi attended the University of San Francisco to play college soccer. In four seasons with the Dons, Lombardi made 58 appearances, scoring eight goals and tallying 19 assists. In 2014 he was named WCC All-Freshman, and in 2016 and 2017 was named 2nd Team All-WCC. 
 
Following college, Lombardi played in the USL PDL with San Francisco City, making two appearances. 2019 saw Lombardi join NPSL club Orange County FC, making 12 appearances and scoring one goal.

Professional
Between February 2020 and early 2022, Lombardi played in Italy with various Serie D sides, including; Fossacesia, Olympia Agnonese and Lanciano.

On 27 January 2022, Lombardi returned to the United States to join USL League One side Chattanooga Red Wolves.

References

External links
 Chattanooga Red Wolves profile

1995 births
Living people
Argentine expatriate footballers
Argentine expatriate sportspeople in Italy
Argentine expatriate sportspeople in the United States
Argentine footballers
Association football defenders
Chattanooga Red Wolves SC players
Expatriate footballers in Italy
Expatriate soccer players in the United States
National Premier Soccer League players
People from Laguna Hills, California
Pol. Olympia Agnonese players
San Francisco Dons men's soccer players
San Francisco City FC players
Serie D players
Soccer players from California
USL League One players
USL League Two players
Footballers from Rosario, Santa Fe